Bodybuilding at the 2008 Asian Beach Games was held in Bali, Indonesia from 19 October to 20 October 2008. The competition included only men's events for six different weight categories. All events were held at Kuta Beach.

Medalists

Medal table

Results

60 kg

Prejudge
19 October

Final
20 October

65 kg

Prejudge
19 October

Final
20 October

70 kg

Prejudge
19 October

Final
20 October

75 kg

Prejudge
19 October

Final
20 October

80 kg

Prejudge
19 October

Final
20 October

85 kg

Prejudge
19 October

Final
20 October

References
 Official site

2008 Asian Beach Games events
2008
Bodybuilding competitions in Indonesia
2008 in bodybuilding